Niños Ricos, Pobres Padres (GenerationY ) is a Colombian telenovela produced by the United States-based television network Telemundo. It debuted on July 7, 2009 at 9:30 pm Eastern Time, taking over the second half of El Rostro de Analía until Friday, July 17, when it completely replaced it in the 9–10 pm slot.

The story revolves around Alejandra Paz, a beautiful 17-year-old girl and her mother, Lucía, an undocumented US immigrant who is deported from Miami back to Bogotá, Colombia; desperate and broke, they are forced to move in with Lucía's hostile sister, Verónica. On the first day, Alejandra is invited to Isabela's party, Esteban's girlfriend. After putting a drug in Alejandra's drink, Alejandra is suddenly raped by Matías, Esteban's friend. Suddenly Alejandra and her mother are submerged into a world of intrigue and betrayal where money is no object and people are not who they seem to be. High school drama soon ensues as Esteban and David fight to win Alejandra's heart. While Esteban and Alejandra date, they are then separated by lies and betrayal made by Mónica and Isabela. Soon Isabela gets pregnant by Gabriel, Rocio and Martha's brother. Later, Isabela lies to Esteban that she is pregnant by him in order to separate him from Alejandra. Suddenly, David learns that he has the opportunity to be with Alejandra, while Alejandra can't forget Esteban and still loves him.

As with most of its other soap operas, the network broadcasts English subtitles as closed captions on CC3.

The number of episodes aired on Telemundo was 131 due to first 2 weeks 20 minutes episodes, 1 hour timeslot was shared with El Rostro de Analía, the international version has 125 episodes.

Cast

Main Cast in Order of Appearance

Broadcasting

External links

2009 telenovelas
2009 American television series debuts
2010 American television series endings
2009 Colombian television series debuts
2010 Colombian television series endings
Colombian telenovelas
RTI Producciones telenovelas
Spanish-language American telenovelas
Telemundo telenovelas